Demetrice A. Webb (born December 8, 1984) is an American former professional football player who was a defensive back. Webb played college football for the University of Florida before playing professionally for the Jacksonville Jaguars of the National Football League (NFL), the Philadelphia Soul of the AFL, and the Hamilton Tiger-Cats and Toronto Argonauts of the Canadian Football League (CFL).

Early years 

Webb was born in Jacksonville, Florida.  He attended Edward H. White High School in Jacksonville, and played high school football for the Ed White Commanders.  Webb was a three-year starter, and was named The Florida Times-Union'''s player of the year after scoring eight times on defense and also serving as the Commanders' starting quarterback.  USA Today'' named him to its high school All-America team, and Rivals.com ranked him as the number two cornerback prospect in the country.

College career 

Webb accepted an athletic scholarship to attend the University of Florida in Gainesville, Florida, where he played for coach Ron Zook and coach Urban Meyer's Florida Gators football teams from 2003 to 2005.  As a junior in 2005, he started twelve games at cornerback, led the Southeastern Conference (SEC) in passes defended, and was a first-team All-SEC selection.  Webb decided to forgo his senior season, and declared himself eligible for the NFL Draft.

Professional career

National Football League 

The Jacksonville Jaguars selected Webb in the seventh round (236th overall pick) of the 2006 NFL Draft. Webb was released by the Jaguars on September 1, 2007 as a training camp cut.

Arena Football League 

On December 7, 2007, Webb signed with the Philadelphia Soul of the Arena Football League.  During the 2008 AFL season, Webb recorded forty tackles for the Soul who went on to win ArenaBowl XXII.  In 2010, Webb signed with the Jacksonville Sharks.  He was released by the Sharks on August 4, 2010 in the hope of trying out for the Miami Dolphins of the NFL.

Canadian Football League 

On April 27, 2009, Webb signed with the Toronto Argonauts of the Canadian Football League. He was eventually released by the Argonauts during training camp.  Webb later signed a practice roster agreement with the Calgary Stampeders. He eventually started one game for the Stampeders, recording 2 defensive tackles. Webb was released by the Stampeders the following season.

On February 14, 2011, Webb re-signed with the Argonauts.

On October 11, 2011, Webb was traded to the Hamilton Tiger-Cats along with a conditional pick in the 2013 CFL Draft for receiver Maurice Mann.

On May 21, 2014, Webb was traded to the Calgary Stampeders in exchange for a conditional pick in the 2015 CFL Draft.

On July 1, 2014, Webb was assigned to the Orlando Predators.

On November 18, 2014, Webb as was assigned to the Las Vegas Outlaws.

See also 

 List of Florida Gators in the NFL Draft

References

External links 
  DeeWebb.com – Official website of Dee Webb
  Demetrice "Dee" Webb – University of Florida player profile at GatorZone.com
  Dee Webb – Calgary Stampeders player profile

1984 births
Living people
Edward H. White High School alumni
Players of American football from Jacksonville, Florida
American football cornerbacks
Florida Gators football players
Jacksonville Jaguars players
Philadelphia Soul players
Jacksonville Sharks players
Orlando Predators players
Las Vegas Outlaws (arena football) players
American players of Canadian football
Canadian football defensive backs
Toronto Argonauts players
Calgary Stampeders players
Hamilton Tiger-Cats players
Track and field athletes from Florida
Florida Gators men's track and field athletes